Alexandru Marin (born 28 November 1957) in Bucharest, is a former Romanian rugby union football player and currently coach.
He played as fullback and as wing.

Career
In his career, Marin played for R.C. Grivița.

International career
Marin was first capped in the match against Czechoslovakia, in Bucharest, on 9 April 1978. He also played the 1987 Rugby World Cup, with his only match in the tournament, against Zimbabwe, being also the last of his international career.

Honours

R.C. Grivița
 Cupa României: 1982-83, 1984–85, 1985–86

Romania
 FIRA Trophy: 1980-81

Notes

External links
Alexandru Marin International Statistics at ESPN

1957 births
Living people
Romanian rugby union players
Romania international rugby union players
Rugby union fullbacks
Rugby union wings
Rugby union players from Bucharest